Events in the year 2014 in Namibia.

Incumbents 

 President: Hifikepunye Pohamba
 Prime Minister: Hage Geingob
 Chief Justice of Namibia: Peter Shivute

Events 

 28 November – General elections were held in the country using electronic voting, the first for an African country.

Deaths

References 

 
2010s in Namibia
Years of the 21st century in Namibia
Namibia
Namibia